Fighting Squadron 72 or VF-72 was an aviation unit of the U.S. Navy, originally established as VF-7 on 1 July 1939, it was redesignated as VF-72 on 19 November 1940 and disestablished on 29 March 1943.

Operational history
VF-7 was originally equipped with Grumman F2F and Grumman F3F aircraft.

In April 1942, VF-72 was based ashore at Naval Station Norfolk and then transferred to the USS Wasp. In early June 1942, VF-72 had reequipped with the F4F-4 at NAS Alameda and from mid-June through July was shore-based at Naval Station Pearl Harbor.

Artist Thomas C. Lea III depicted VF-72's executive officer, Lt A. C. “Silver” Emerson in action during the Solomon Islands campaign in his painting "Defending the Ship."

Home port assignments
NAS Norfolk
NAS Alameda
Naval Station Pearl Harbor

Aircraft assignment
Grumman F2F-1
Grumman F3F-1
Grumman F4F-3 Wildcat

See also
 List of inactive United States Navy aircraft squadrons
 History of the United States Navy

References

External links

Aircraft squadrons of the United States Navy